MHDYS (vocalized by historians as Mehadeyis) was a King of the Kingdom of Aksum (c. 360). He is primarily known through the coins that were minted during his reign.

MHDYS re-established Ge'ez as the language used on all his coins. Munro-Hay notes that the legend upon MHDYS's bronze coins, bzmsql tmw ("By this cross you will conquer"), was a loose translation of the famous motto of Emperor Constantine the Great, In hoc signo vinces ("By this sign you will conquer").

See also
Aksumite currency
Ge'ez language

References

Kings of Axum
4th-century monarchs in Africa